Patrick Cassidy (born 1956) is an Irish orchestral, choral, and film score composer.

Cassidy was born in Claremorris, County Mayo, Ireland. He received a BSC in Applied Mathematics from the University of Limerick in 1985, and supported his early compositional activities with a day job as a statistician.

He is best known for his narrative cantatas – works he has written for orchestra and choir based on Irish mythology.
The Children of Lir, released in September 1993, remained at number one in the Irish classical charts for a full year. It was the first cantata written in the Irish language since the work of Paul McSwiney in the late 1800s. The BBC later produced an hour long documentary on the piece. Famine Remembrance, a commissioned piece to commemorate the 150th anniversary of the Irish Famine, was premiered in New York's St. Patrick's Cathedral in 1996. In June 2007, the piece was performed at the opening of Toronto's Ireland Park with the President of Ireland as special guest.

Other albums include Cruit (arrangements of 17th- and 18th-century Irish harp music with Cassidy as the soloist) and Deirdre of the Sorrows, another cantata in the Irish language, recorded with the London Symphony Orchestra and the Tallis Choir. In 2004, Immortal Memory was released; a collaboration between Cassidy and Lisa Gerrard.

Cassidy now lives in Los Angeles with his family, where in addition to his concert work he has scored and collaborated on films and documentaries. He is a cousin to the band, Na Casaidigh, and a relative of the singer Sibéal Ní Chasaide who sang his arrangement of Patrick Pearse's Mise Eire at the official government commemorations of the 1916 Rising.

Cassidy's song Proclamation was played at the inauguration of Joe Biden in Washington DC on 20 January 2021.

Notable credits
Cassidy provided music for the following:

Hannibal (2001)
Veronica Guerin (2003)
Confessions of a Burning Man (2003)
Salem's Lot (2004)
King Arthur (2004)
Layer Cake (2004)
Che Guevara (2005)
Ashes and Snow (2005)
Kingdom of Heaven (2005)
The Front Line (2006)
Breaking the Ice (2007)
Edgar Allen Poe's Ligeia (2008)
Kill the Irishman (2011)
In 2010, Cassidy's Funeral March was used in the trailer for The Tree of Life. In 2011, he recorded a new setting of the Latin mass with the London Symphony Orchestra and London Voices.

Discography
1993: The Children of Lir (London Symphony Orchestra and Tallis Chamber Choir)
1997: Famine Remembrance
1998: Deirdre of the Sorrows
2004: Immortal Memory – with Lisa Gerrard
2006: Ashes and Snow – with Lisa Gerrard
2014: Calvary
2016: 1916: The Irish Rebellion

References

External links
Air-Edel Associates

1956 births
Date of birth missing (living people)
Irish composers
Irish expatriates in the United States
Irish film score composers
Living people
Irish songwriters
Male film score composers
Musicians from County Mayo
People from Claremorris